Siedenburg is a Samtgemeinde ("collective municipality") in the district of Diepholz, in Lower Saxony, Germany. Its seat is in Siedenburg.

The Samtgemeinde Siedenburg consists of the following municipalities:

 Borstel  
 Maasen 
 Mellinghausen 
 Siedenburg
 Staffhorst

Samtgemeinden in Lower Saxony